Anchonus is a genus of true weevils in the beetle family Curculionidae. There are more than 150 described species in Anchonus.

Species
Species in the genus include:
 Anchonus blatchleyi Sleeper, 1954
 Anchonus duryi Blatchley, 1916
 Anchonus floridanus Schwarz, 1894
 Anchonus scrabrosus Hustache, 1929
 Anchonus suillus Guérin-Méneville, F.E., 1829-44

See also
 List of Anchonus species

References

Further reading

 
 
 

Molytinae
Articles created by Qbugbot